Dolno Dupeni is a village in the Resen Municipality of North Macedonia. Located on Lake Prespa, its beach runs to the border with Greece.

Demographics
Dolno Dupeni has 235 inhabitants as of the most recent census of 2002. Macedonians have historically made up at least 96% of the village population. A large number of refugees settled from Greek Macedonia after being forcefully evacuated from the villages of Northern Greece.

Climate 
Dolno Dupeni has nice, pleasant weather because of its elevation and geographic position. This village have mixture of Mediterranean and Continental Alpine climates. Heavy snowfalls was happening in the past but they are rare now. Below-freezing temperatures are common during the winter months, while summers are warm with cool nights. This climate is considered to be Cfb according to the Köppen-Geiger climate classification. The average annual temperature is 8.7 °C | 47.7 °F. In a year, the rainfall is 702 mm | 27.6 inch. 

Here are some average weather facts we collected from our historical climate data:

 During the month of May, June, July, September and October you are most likely to experience good weather with pleasant average temperatures that fall between 20 degrees Celsius (68°F) and 25 degrees Celsius (77°F).
 The months of November and December have a high chance of precipitation.
 The warmest month is August with an average maximum temperature of 27°C (81°F).
 The coldest month is January with an average maximum temperature of 6°C (42°F).
 November is the most wet month.
 August is the driest month.

Media
A local TV series called Pogresno Vreme was recorded in the village. It was recorded in 2000 and had 37 episodes. All of them can be viewed on youtube.

People from Dolno Dupeni
Dragi Mitrevski (1959 - ), archaeologist
Vlado Popovski (1941 - ), politician and professor

References

Villages in Resen Municipality